Lallo Gori (7 March 1927 – 1 December 1982) was an Italian composer and musician.

Life and career 
Born in Cervia, Ravenna as Coriolano Gori, Gori graduated in piano, harmony and composition at the Giuseppe Verdi Conservatory in Turin. He entered RAI as a member of its orchestra, then he became the musical director of its office in Rome.

Gori was best known as a composer of scores for films, and composed around 80 of them. These included several Spaghetti Westerns, poliziotteschis and thrillers, such as Primitive Love, Massacre Time, Dead Men Don't Make Shadows, Werewolf Woman and The Iron Commissioner.  He also composed several pop songs, and three of them entered the competition at the Sanremo Music Festival.

Selected filmography 

 Tough Guys (1960)
Hercules Against the Sons of the Sun (1964)
Primitive Love (1964)
How We Robbed the Bank of Italy (1966)
Massacre Time (1966)
 Honeymoon, Italian Style (1966)
Poker with Pistols (1967)
Death Rides Along (1967)
Pecos Cleans Up (1967)
The Handsome, the Ugly, and the Stupid (1967)
The Two Crusaders (1968)
Execution (1968)
Don Chisciotte and Sancio Panza (1968)
Buckaroo: The Winchester Does Not Forgive (1968)
The Avenger, Zorro (1969)
Dead Men Don't Make Shadows (1970)
Django and Sartana Are Coming... It's the End (1970)
Savage Guns (1971)
Il clan dei due Borsalini (1971)
A Fistful of Death (1971)
A Barrel Full of Dollars (1971)
 Tequila! (1973)
King Dick (1973)
The Sinful Nuns of Saint Valentine (1974)
Calling All Police Cars (1975)
Werewolf Woman (1976)
Return of the 38 Gang (1977)
Could It Happen Here? (1977)
The Criminals Attack, The Police Respond (1977)
The Iron Commissioner (1978)
The Uranium Conspiracy (1978)

References

External links 
 
 Lallo Gori at Discogs

1927 births
1982 deaths
Italian film score composers
Italian male film score composers
People from the Province of Ravenna
Milan Conservatory alumni
20th-century Italian composers
20th-century Italian male musicians